The WTA Tier III tournaments were Women's Tennis Association tennis third-level tournaments held from 1990 until the end of the 2008 season. The line-up of events varied over the years due to tournaments being promoted, demoted or cancelled. 

From 2009, most Tier III and Tier IV tournaments from previous seasons became WTA International Tournaments owing to a category change. The main reason for the changes was to ease the pressure on players in terms of the number of tournaments that they were required to play.

Events

Notes
 Years in the "surface" or "country" columns only refer to the period that the tournament was played on the surface or in that country as a Tier III tournament.

References

External links

 Tier 3
Recurring sporting events established in 1990
Recurring sporting events disestablished in 2008